Child Villiers is the surname of a British aristocratic family (Child was added to the Villiers name by the 5th earl by royal licence in 1819, as noted in his article).

Persons bearing this name include:

Francis Child Villiers (1819–1862), British politician, son of the 5th earl
George Child Villiers, 5th Earl of Jersey (1773–1859), British courtier and politician
George Child Villiers, 6th Earl of Jersey (1808–1859)
George Child Villiers, 8th Earl of Jersey (1873–1923), British politician
George Child Villiers, 9th Earl of Jersey (1910–1998)
George Child-Villiers, Viscount Villiers (1948–1998), son of the 9th earl
Sarah Villiers, Countess of Jersey (1785–1867), wife of the 5th earl
Victor Child Villiers, 7th Earl of Jersey (1845–1915), British banker, politician and Governor of New South Wales
Virginia Cherrill (1908–1996), American actress who married the 9th earl and became Virginia Child-Villiers, Countess of Jersey
William Child-Villiers, 10th Earl of Jersey (born 1976), British producer, actor and writer

See also
Villiers family

Compound surnames